Kambarka Engineering Works - Full name: Open Joint Stock Company «Kambarka Engineering Works» ( or ). A rolling stock manufacturer, located in the city of Kambarka (Udmurt), Russia.

History of the Factory 
Construction of an iron work started in 1761 and opened in 1767. The foundry produced up to 60,000 tons of iron per year. In 1950 the company shifted its focus towards railway technology.

Products
Produced for: Russia, Estonia, Latvia, Lithuania, Ukraine, Belarus, Poland, Bulgaria, Slovakia, Argentina, Vietnam, Cambodia, Cuba, Mali, Nicaragua, Uzbekistan, Guinea-Bissau.

Main products

Diesel Locomotives
 TU4 (1961–1972)
 TU5 (1967–1973)
 TU6 (1968–1971)
 TU6A (1973–1988)
 TU6SPA (1980 - 1993 - today)
 TU7 (1970 - 1986)
 TU7A (1986 - 2009 - today)
 TU8G (1988 - today)
 TU8P (1988 - today)
 TU8 (1988 - today)
 TU10 (2010 - today)

Passenger cars
 Passenger car
 Sleeping car
 Hospital car
 Dining car (also executive)
 Railway post office

Railroad freight cars
 Open wagon for peat
 Side-tipping wagon
 Hopper car
 Tank car
 Flatcar

Other
 Mobile power stations - TU6SPA
 Railway crane
 Work train
 Snowplow
 LD24

Gallery of products

See also
Narrow gauge railways
Narrow gauge railways in Russia

References and sources

External links 

Official website Kambarka Engineering Works 
Official Kambarka Engineering Works Facebook 
Series locomotive TU7 / modifications 
Modernization of the children's railway 

Locomotive manufacturers of Russia
Rail vehicle manufacturers of Russia
Companies established in 1767
Russian brands
1767 establishments in the Russian Empire
Companies based in Udmurtia